Calcutta News may refer to:
Calcutta News (film)
Calcutta News (TV channel)